C'mon, Accept Your Joy! is the debut album of Athens, Georgia-based power pop band Chris McKay & the Critical Darlings.  According to Flagpole Magazine, "There’s a vague but strong taste of Cheap Trick’s “Surrender” in its muscular smiling power-pop, and that’s always a selling point." The University of Georgia paper Red and Black declared the disc as sounding like "the Clash or some other music from that time."

Track listing 
 "Towel Cape Song"  – 3:31
 "I Know Too Much (For My Own Good)"  – 4:22
 "Into My View"  – 3:57 
 "Sometimes I'm Sam"  – 4:10
 "Phony"  – 5:32 
 "Down"  – 5:22
 "Colors in Black & White"  – 3:28
 "Until The Road Ends"  – 2:25
 "Taking Its Toll"  – 5:49
 "I'll Be Fine"  – 4:50

Personnel 
 Chris McKay - lead vocals, guitars, bass, Rhodes, synths
 Frank DeFreese - bass, rhythm guitar
 Tom Bavis - drums, percussion, vocals, white noise, synths

Album notes 
 Produced, arranged and sequenced by Chris McKay and Tom Bavis
 Mastered at City Mastering by Jeff Capurso
 Recorded at D.A.R.C in Athens, Georgia
 All songs Copyright 2005 Blather Skite Music, ASCAP
 Cover painting by Scott Bullock Penumbra Studios
 Live photo by Amanda Stahl
 Back cover band portrait by Asa Leffer
 Graphic design and layout defaulted to Chris McKay

Notes

External links 
 Official Critical Darlings Site, Accessed on April 3, 2008.
 Official Myspace Site, Accessed on April 3, 2008.

2007 debut albums
Chris McKay & the Critical Darlings albums